Pixel shifting refers to various technical methods, either to diminish damage to displays by preventing "burn in" of static images or to enhance resolution of displays, projectors, and digital imaging devices. The term is often used synonymously with the more specific term pixel shift.

Purposes

Avoid burn-in 
See Pixel shifting avoids burn-in explained in detail for both analogue and digital screens.

Enhance character display resolution on terminals 
Computer terminals such as the HP 2645A used a half-shift algorithm to move pixel positions by half a screen pixel in order to support the generation of multiple complex character sets.

Increase projection resolution 
Pixel shifting has been implemented in video projectors to expand the native 1080p resolution to produce an effectively 4K image on the screen. An exemplary implementation by the electronics corporation JVC is referred to as "e-shift".

Increase capture and/or tonal resolution 

Pixel shifting by movement of one or more sensors is a technique to increase resolution and/or colour rendering of image capturing devices. 
 The image at right displays the visible gain both in detail and in colour resolution produced by the Sony α7R IV 16-shot pixel shift mode, which results in a 240 Mpixel image, as compared to a single shot with the standard sensor resolution of 61 Mpixel. The crops taken from each image display the coat of arms at exactly the same size, albeit with different pixel counts.

One or more separate color channel sensors  
Some camcorders and digital microscopes employ separate color channel sensors (usually RGB = red, green, blue) sensors. 
 Pixel shifting may be implemented for one or more of these sensors by moving such a sensor by a fraction of a pixel (or even a whole pixel value) in both x- and y-direction.  
 For example, early high-definition camcorders used a 3CCD sensor block of 960 × 540 pixels each.  Shifting the red and blue sensors (but not the green sensor) by 0.5 pixel in both vertical and horizontal directions permitted the recovery of a 1920 × 1080 luminance signal.

One multi colour channel sensor 
Currently most consumer imaging devices (cameras, camcorders, smartphones) employ a single multi colour channel sensor, on which the RGB (red, green, blue) pixels are usually arranged in a Bayer pattern. Thus any mode of pixel shifting movement either by fractional or by whole pixel values, whether to obtain a more detailed image or to improve tonal resolution, must necessarily engage the whole sensor.
 More detailed information is to be obtained on page Pixel shift.

Other implementations

Related features 
 The first stabilization mechanism for a still-camera sensor was implemented in 2003 by Minolta as a new feature of the camera model Minolta Dimage A1. The purpose of this implementation was to counter-act camera shake only. The first consumer still-camera that utilised sensor movement to enhance detail and/or tonal resolution was the Pentax K-3 II, released in 2015 by Pentax.
 Also see Image stabilization, section 'Sensor-shift'.

References 

Display technology
Television technology
Imaging